Fred George Aandahl (April 9, 1897 – April 7, 1966) was an American Republican politician from North Dakota. He served as the 23rd Governor of North Dakota from 1945 to 1951 and as a U.S. Representative from 1951 to 1953.

Biography
Aandahl was born in Svea Township, North Dakota, the son of Norwegian emigrant Soren "Sam" J. Aandahl and his American-born wife, Mamie C. (Lawry) Aandahl. He graduated from Litchville High School, and then from the University of North Dakota in 1921 and became a farmer. He was a schoolteacher, a principal, and then superintendent of Litchville's schools from 1922 to 1927.  On June 28, 1926, he married Luella Brekke, and they had three daughters.

Career
In 1931, 1939 and 1941 Aandahl was member of the North Dakota State Senate. From 1945 to 1951 he was governor of the state, and during his tenure, natural resources were protected and conservation programs were promoted.   He was elected as a Republican to the Eighty-second United States Congress (January 3, 1951 – January 3, 1953). He was not a candidate for the Eighty-third Congress in 1952, but was an unsuccessful candidate for the United States Senate, losing 58%-42% to incumbent William Langer in the Republican Primary. Aandahl then ran in the General Election against Langer and Democrat Harold A. Morrison and finished in third place and 10% of the vote. From 1953 to 1961 he was appointed Assistant Secretary of the Interior during both of President Dwight D. Eisenhower's administrations.

Death
Aandahl died in Fargo, North Dakota and was interred in Hillside Cemetery, Valley City.

References

External links
Fred G. Aandahl Papers at The University of North Dakota

State Historical Society of North Dakota

Republican Party governors of North Dakota
Republican Party North Dakota state senators
Farmers from North Dakota
University of North Dakota alumni
American Lutherans
American people of Norwegian descent
1897 births
1966 deaths
Lutherans from North Dakota
People from Barnes County, North Dakota
Republican Party members of the United States House of Representatives from North Dakota
20th-century American politicians
20th-century Lutherans